The County of Vermilion River is a municipal district located in the eastern part of central Alberta, Canada in Census Division No. 10. The municipal district was formerly named the County of Vermilion River No. 24 prior to an official name change that became effective on September 13, 2006.

The administrative offices of the County of Vermilion River are located at Kitscoty. The Vermilion River flows through the County and is the namesake of the region.

The Yellowhead Highway and Buffalo Trail are major transportation routes in the County.  Several communities in the County such as Vermilion and Kitscoty are serviced by CN Rail.

Geography

Communities and localities 
The following urban municipalities are surrounded by the County of Vermilion River.
Cities
Lloydminster (Alberta portion)
Towns
Vermilion
Villages
Kitscoty (location of municipal office)
Marwayne
Paradise Valley
Summer villages
none

The following hamlets are located within the County of Vermilion River.
Hamlets
Blackfoot
Clandonald
Dewberry
Islay
McLaughlin
Rivercourse
Streamstown
Tulliby Lake

The following localities are located within the County of Vermilion River.
Localities 

Alcurve
Auburndale
Borradaile
Claysmore
Coop Trailer Park
Dina
Earlie
Grandview Estates
Greenlawn
Hazeldine
Hindville
Indian Lake Meadows
Koknee
Landonville
Lea Park

McDonaldville
Morningold Estates
Moyerton
New Lindsay
Oxville
Ridgeclough
Robinwood Acres
Sidcup
Silver Birch Farms
South Ferriby
Staplehurst
Tolland
Vanesti
Wildmere
Willowlea

Demographics 

In the 2016 Census of Population conducted by Statistics Canada, the County of Vermilion River had a population of 8,267 living in 2,981 of its 3,268 total private dwellings, a  change from its 2011 population of 7,905.

The population of the County of Vermilion River according to its 2015 municipal census is 8,116, a  change from its 2008 municipal census population of 7,900.

Attractions 
Several golf courses are located in the county, among them Lloydminster Golf and Country Club, Lea Park Golf Club, Rolling Green Fairways Golf Course & Campground, Paradise Valley Golf Course and Vermilion Golf Course.

Campgrounds are found at Jubilee Regional Park, Vermilion Provincial Park, Nothing Barred Ranch and Iron River Ranch.

The Vermilion Heritage Museum is located in the town of Vermilion. Other museums include Climbing Through Time Museum in Paradise Valley, Dewberry Valley Museum in Dewberry and Morrison Museum of the Country School in Islay.

The Lea Park Professional Rodeo is held every yer in June.

Other recreational activities are hiking in the Vermilion Provincial Park and Nothing Barred Ranch (cross-country skiing in winter), fishing for rainbow trout at the Vermilion Provincial Park Trout Pond or pike and perch at Raft Lake.

See also 
List of communities in Alberta
List of municipal districts in Alberta

References

External links 

 
Vermilion River